blackbush is the debut EP by American alt-rock band Flagship, released May 8, 2012, under exclusive license to Bright Antenna Records. The album was made available as a Digital Download, and CD available only at shows.

A preview of the album was released on Earmilk on May 8, 2012. In premiering the track "Still I Wait", Baeble Music said that the band "matches the emotional and nearly spiritual alternative rock of U2 circa Achtung Baby with the deep-throated baritone delivery of lead singer Drake Margolnick ala Ian Curtis from Joy Division and some of the seething anger and rawness of We Are Augustines."

Track listing
Backseat - 4:16
Still I Wait - 4:19
The Knife - 4:02
The Fool - 4:35
Older - 4:49

Personnel
Produced by Flagship and Tate Huff 
Tracking and vocal coaching by Jeremy Current
Engineered by Tate Huff 
Mixed by Will Brierre
Mastered by Darian Cowgill
A&R by Braden Merrick

References

External links
blackbush EP on iTunes

2012 debut EPs
Flagship (band) albums